Samsung Galaxy Tab 4 Education is a tablet computer in the Samsung Galaxy Tab series of tablets, announced and released by Samsung on May 16, 2014.

Announcement
Samsung announced the tablet in a press release saying that "Samsung is committed to powering education by empowering educators". The initial price of the tablet is set at #369.99 and is available through Samsung partnered channels for the time being. A tablet computer that is based on the popular Google Android-based operating system was launched with students in mind. It belongs to the fourth generation of tablets and comes in a 10.1 inch screen.

Specifications
Samsung has also announced that the device will support Google Play Store Education and will be compatible with Samsung School. With the support for multi-window, students would be able to do more in less time.

1.2 GHz ARM processor and a modest 1.5GB RAM makes the device snappy enough for the purpose it was created. A battery life of up to 10 hrs, the device would also be able to connect to a bigger monitor so that teacher can share a student's work with all the students in a classroom using HDMI port.

The device will come in a ruggedized rubber which will allow better grip and a tougher use. This was made with students in mind. Galaxy Tab 4 Education comes standard with 16GB memory, with a MicroSD Card Slot for up to 64GB of additional storage.

References

Tablet computers introduced in 2014
Tablet computers
Samsung Galaxy Tab series